My Unfortunate Boyfriend is a 2015 South Korean television series starring Yang Jin-sung, No Min-woo, Yoon Hak and Han Hye-rin. It aired on MBC Dramanet on Fridays and Saturdays at 20:00 (UTC) for 16 episodes from April 10, 2015 to May 30, 2015.

Cast

Main characters 
 Yang Jin-sung as Yoo Ji-na
 No Min-woo as Yoon Tae-woon
 Jeon Jin-seo as young Yoo Tae-woon
 Yoon-hak as Kang Hee-chul
 Han Hye-rin as Jung Hye-mi

Supporting characters 
 Yoon Joo-sang as Boss Yoon
 Kil Yong-woo as Hye-mi's father
 Ahn Eun-jung as Soo-ji
 Lee Yong-joo as Man-soo
 Park Jin-joo as Mal-sook
 Kim Jin-geun as Ji-na's father
 Kim Hyeseon as Ji-na's mother
 Cha Joo-young as Cha Ju-young	
 Kim Dong-hee as Hong Jang-pyung
 Lee Sang-gu as Secretary Wang
 Heo Jae-ho as Choi Ki-nam
 Kim Do-yeon as Oh Mi-ran
 Kim Hee-won as Woman from Cheongju
 Kim Eun-jung as Julia
 Ahn Ah-young as Geum Ah-young

References

External links 
 My Unfortunate Boyfriend official MBC Dramanet website 
 

2015 South Korean television series debuts
2015 South Korean television series endings
MBC TV television dramas
Korean-language television shows